Cystocentesis is a veterinary procedure where a needle is placed into the urinary bladder through the abdominal wall of an animal and a sample of urine is removed. Diagnostic cystocentesis is used to prevent the sample taken for urinalysis from being contaminated with bacteria, cells and debris from the lower urogenital tract.  Therapeutic cystocentesis may be employed to relieve pressure buildup due to urethral obstruction. Therapeutic cystocentesis is typically last resort for relief, as a greatly distended bladder is more likely to rupture when punctured. A safer method of emptying the urinary bladder in this condition is by urethral catheterization.

References

Veterinary procedures